is a Japanese mathematician. He grew up in the prefecture of Wakayama in Japan. He attended college at the University of Tokyo, from which he also obtained his master's degree in 1975, and his PhD in 1980. He was a professor at Tokyo University, Tokyo Institute of Technology and Kyoto University. He joined the faculty of the University of Chicago in 2009. 

He has contributed to  number theory and related parts of algebraic geometry. His first work was in the higher-dimensional generalisations of local class field theory using algebraic K-theory. His theory was then extended to higher global class field theory in which several of his papers were written jointly with Shuji Saito. 

He contributed to various other areas such as  p-adic Hodge theory, logarithmic geometry (he was one of its creators together with Jean-Marc Fontaine and Luc Illusie), comparison conjectures, special values of zeta functions including applications to the  Birch-Swinnerton-Dyer conjecture, the Bloch-Kato conjecture on Tamagawa numbers, and Iwasawa theory.

A special volume of Documenta Mathematica was published in honor of his 50th birthday, together with research papers written by leading number theorists and former students it contains Kato's song on Prime Numbers.

In 2005 Kato received the Imperial Prize of the Japan Academy for "Research on Arithmetic Geometry".

Books
Kato has published several books in Japanese, of which some have already been translated into English. 

He wrote a book on Fermat's Last Theorem and is also the coauthor of the two volumes of the trilogy on Number Theory, which have been translated into English.

References

20th-century Japanese mathematicians
21st-century Japanese mathematicians
Number theorists
1952 births
Living people
People from Wakayama Prefecture
University of Tokyo alumni
Academic staff of Kyoto University
Academic staff of the University of Tokyo
Academic staff of Tokyo Institute of Technology
University of Chicago faculty
Laureates of the Imperial Prize
Fellows of the American Academy of Arts and Sciences